Jersey Island is an island in the Sacramento-San Joaquin River Delta of Contra Costa County, California, approximately  east of Antioch. The  bounded on the west by the San Joaquin River-Stockton Deepwater Shipping Channel, on the north by the False River, on the northeast by Piper Slough, on the east by Taylor Slough, and on the south by Dutch Slough. It is administered by Reclamation District 830.

See also
Islands of California

References

Islands of Contra Costa County, California
Islands of the San Francisco Bay Area
Islands of the Sacramento–San Joaquin River Delta
Islands of Northern California